The Castellazzo di Camastra is a castle in Camastra, Sicily. It was built in the 14th century, and it now lies in ruins.

History
The Castellazzo was built in the 14th century on the edge of a rocky plateau to control the surrounding estates. The oldest reference to a turris Camastra dates back to 1366, and in 1374 the area was in the possession of the nobleman Manfredi Chiaramonte.

The site of the Castellazzo has been identified with the legendary city of Camico.

Layout
The Castellazzo consists of an irregular pentagonal tower, which is made up of stones bound together by mortar. Parts of the structure also consist of Cyclopean masonry. Some of the remaining walls are up to 3.5m high.

References

Camastra
Camastra
Buildings and structures in the Province of Agrigento
Buildings and structures completed in the 14th century
Medieval Italian architecture
14th-century establishments in Italy